Robert Isaac Dey Gray (ca.  1772 – October 8, 1804) was a lawyer, judge and political figure in Upper Canada.

He was probably born in New York, but came to Canada with his parents (James Gray and Elizabeth Low) at the beginning of the American Revolution.  He studied law and was called to the bar in 1794. In 1795, he became Solicitor General for the province.  He became a district court judge for the Home District in 1796.

He was elected to the 2nd Parliament of Upper Canada representing Stormont and the 3rd and 4th Parliament of Upper Canada representing Stormont and Russell.

He assumed the duties of the attorney general after the death of John White in 1800 until Thomas Scott arrived in 1801.

On October 7, 1804, he left York (Toronto) aboard  to prosecute a murder case at the district town for the Newcastle District. The ship sank off Presqu'ile Point in a storm on Lake Ontario and all hands were lost.

Gray was a slave owner and, upon his death, he freed one enslaved woman, Dorinda (or Dorine) Baker, through his will.

References

External links 
Biography at the Dictionary of Canadian Biography Online

1804 deaths
Members of the Legislative Assembly of Upper Canada
Canadian lawyers
People from the United Counties of Stormont, Dundas and Glengarry
Treasurers of the Law Society of Upper Canada
Year of birth uncertain
1772 births
Upper Canada judges
Attorneys-General of Upper Canada
Canadian slave owners